Velocio–SRAM Pro Cycling, formerly known as Specialized–lululemon, was a professional cycling team based in the United States that competes in elite road bicycle racing and track cycling events. The final-season title sponsors were SRAM Corporation and Cervelo bicycles. Velocio Sports was the holding company for the team and the place-holder during a larger search for a title sponsor.

Before 2012, the team was owned by Bob Stapleton's High Road Sports and was known in 2011 as HTC–Highroad Women. Following HTC's withdrawal of sponsorship and the failure to find a replacement sponsor, a new company, Velocio Sports, directed by High Road's former Marketing and Communications officer Kristy Scrymgeour, was set up to own the team, but most of the riders and other staff remained the same.

Prior to 2008, the team was named T-Mobile Women. Columbia Sportswear were a title sponsor from July 2008 until the end of 2010.

In August 2015, Scrymgeour announced that the team would be disbanded at the end of the 2015 season. Under Scrymgeour's management, and with the introduction of team time trials world championships for trade teams in 2012, the team has won every TTT world championships in the team's existence.

History

2009

The main new riders for the team were the European Time Travel Champion Ellen van Dijk and the Canadian national champion Alex Wrubleski. Alexis Rhodes and Madeleine Sandig left the team and Anke Wichmann and Oenone Wood both retired.

2010

2011

The main new riders for the team were the Americans Amber Neben and Amanda Miller and the German time trial champion Charlotte Becker. Sadly, in January, Carla Swart died whilst training after being hit by a truck. After winning a stage, Ellen van Dijk won the Ladies Tour of Qatar which was the 400th victory for the team (men's and women's) since 2008. Ina Teutenberg won the fifth round in the Women's World Cup and the team won the seventh round, the Open de Suède Vårgårda team time trial. The team finished second overall in the World Cup. Judith Arndt finished fourth in the individual standings and Teutenberg fifth. At the end of the season Arndt took the third place in the UCI World Ranking, Teutenberg fourth and the team ended in second place in the team classification.

2012

After the men's team HTC–Highroad stopped, Kristy Scrymgeour convinced manufacturer Specialized and sports apparel company Lululemon Athletica to perpetuate the women's team in this Olympic year. The team changed slightly: Clara Hughes and Trixi Worrack were the main new recruits, while Judith Arndt, team leader since 2006, joined GreenEdge–AIS. The team had a great year. Ina-Yoko Teutenberg won numerous sprints and finished fourth in the road race of the Olympic Games. Evelyn Stevens had an excellent season by winning at the world cup race Flèche Wallonne, she won a prestigious stage of the Giro d'Italia Femminile and finished on the podium in the end and she won the general classification of the La Route de France. At the end of the season the team was in fourth place in the UCI World Ranking. Ellen van Dijk won the general classification of the Lotto–Decca Tour, the Omloop van Borsele and several stage races. The team dominated especially in the team time trials. Ellen van Dijk together with Stevens, Hughes, Amber Neben and Trixi Worrack or Teutenberg were consistent and undefeated the whole year. At the end of the season the team won the first team time trial at the world championship which was a main goal for the team this year. The team finished second in the UCI World Ranking.

2013

Three riders joined the team in 2013, American cyclists Carmen Small and Tayler Wiles, and the Canadian Gillian Carleton. Charlotte Becker, Emilia Fahlin, Chloe Hosking, Clara Hughes and Amber Neben left the team in the post-Olympic year. The year was marked with a crash of Ina-Yoko Teutenberg at the Drenste 8 in March. She was unable to ride for the remainder of the season and ended her career afterwards. Ellen van Dijk became the leader of the team and had a great season. She won the general classification of a stage race four times as well as several one-day races and finished four times on the podium in World Cup races. Above all she won the World Time Trial Championships. Van Dijk finished 3rd in the final World Cup standings and also 3rd in the UCI World Ranking. Evelyn Stevens had to miss the Tour of Flanders due to a fall. She finished fifth in the Giro Rosa, third in the Route de France, with the American Team and finished behind teammates Ellen van Dijk and Carmen Small (3rd place), fourth in the time trial at the World Championships. She finished ultimately 7th in the UCI world Ranking. 
The team was, like last year, undefeated in the team time trials and won the World Team Time Trial Championships in September. The team finished 3rd in the UCI World Ranking.

2014

After being part of the team since 2005, Ina-Yoko Teutenberg left the team for her retirement. Also Ellen van Dijk, the top UCI ranked and best rider of the 2013 season left the team, together with Gillian Carleton and Katie Colclough. The team attracted Chantal Blaak, Karol-Ann Canuel, Élise Delzenne and Tiffany Cromwell, with the last becoming the leader of the team. After losing the backing of the two major sponsors (Lululemon and Specialized) the team announced that Cervelo would return to the Women's peloton and become a partner of the new team with SRAM also entering the team as a title sponsor as the team becomes rebranded into Velocio–SRAM Pro Cycling.

2015
In preparation for the 2015 season the team signed Barbara Guarischi and Alena Amialiusik, as well as signing contract extensions with Loren Rowney, Élise Delzenne, Karol-Ann Canuel and Trixi Worrack.

Major wins

National, continental and world champions

2003
 United States Road Race Championships, Amber Neben
 United States Time Trial Championships,  Kimberly Bruckner Baldwin
2004
 United States Road Race Championships, Kristin Armstrong
2005
 United States Time Trial Championships, Kristin Armstrong
 United States U23 Time Trial Championships, Rebecca Much
2006
 Canada Cyclo-cross Championships, Lyne Bessette
2007
 World Track Championship (Points Race), Kates Bates
 European U23 Time Trial Championship, Linda Villumsen
2008
 Australia Road Race Championship, Oenone Wood
 Denmark Time Trial Championship, Linda Villumsen
 Denmark Road Championship, Linda Villumsen
 Sweden Road Championship, Emilia Fahlin
 Germany Road Championship, Luise Keller
2009
 Sweden Time Trial Championship, Emilia Fahlin
 Denmark Time Trial Championship, Linda Villumsen
 Denmark Road Race Championship, Linda Villumsen
 Germany Road Race Championship, Ina-Yoko Teutenberg
 European U23 Time Trial Championships, Ellen van Dijk
2010
 Australia Criterium Championship, Chloe Hosking
 Sweden Road Race Championship, Emilia Fahlin
 Sweden Time Trial Championship, Emilia Fahlin
 United States Time Trial Championship, Evelyn Stevens
 Germany Time Trial Championship, Judith Arndt
 Netherlands Track Championship (Individual Pursuit), Ellen van Dijk
2011
 World Time Trial Championship, Judith Arndt
 Sweden Time Trial Championship, Emilia Fahlin
 United States Time Trial Championship, Evelyn Stevens
 Germany Time Trial Championship, Judith Arndt
 Germany Road Championship, Ina-Yoko Teutenberg
 Netherlands Track Championship (Individual Pursuit), Ellen van Dijk
 Netherlands Track Championship (Madison), Ellen van Dijk
2012
 Pan American Time Trial Championship, Amber Neben
 Dutch Time Trial Championship, Ellen van Dijk
 Canada Time Trial Championship, Clara Hughes
 United States Time Trial Championship, Amber Neben
 World Team Time Trial Championships, Ellen van Dijk, Charlotte Becker, Amber Neben, Evelyn Stevens, Ina-Yoko Teutenberg, Trixi Worrack
2013
 German Cyclo-cross Championships, Trixi Worrack
 United States Time Trial Championship, Carmen Small
 Dutch Time Trial Championships, Ellen van Dijk
 German Time Trial Championships, Lisa Brennauer
 German Road Race Championships, Trixi Worrack
 German Track Championships (Individual Pursuit), Lisa Brennauer
 World Team Time Trial Championships, Evelyn Stevens, Ellen van Dijk, Lisa Brennauer, Katie Colclough, Trixi Worrack and Carmen Small
 World Individual Time Trial Championships, Ellen van Dijk
2014
 Pan American Time Trial Championship, Evelyn Stevens
 German Time Trial Championships, Lisa Brennauer
 German Road Race Championships, Lisa Brennauer
 France National Track Championships (Points race), Élise Delzenne
 France National Track Championships (Scratch race), Élise Delzenne
 German Track Championships (Individual Pursuit), Mieke Kröger
 World Individual Time Trial Championships, Lisa Brennauer
 World Team Time Trial Championships, Chantal Blaak, Lisa Brennauer, Karol-Ann Canuel, Carmen Small, Evelyn Stevens, Trixi Worrack
2015
 Canada Time Trial, Karol-Ann Canuel
 Belarus Time Trial Championships, Alena Amialiusik
 German Road Race Championships, Trixi Worrack
 German Time Trial Championships, Mieke Kröger
 Belarus Road Race Championships, Alena Amialiusik
 World Team Time Trial Championships, Alena Amialiusik, Lisa Brennauer, Karol-Ann Canuel, Barbara Guarishi, Mieke Kröger, Trixi Worrack

Team roster

See also
List of Team Specialized–lululemon riders

References

External links

 Official Velocio–SRAM Pro Cycling website
 
 

 
UCI Women's Teams
Cycling teams based in the United States
Defunct cycling teams based in the United States
Women's sports teams in the United States
UCI Road World Champions (women)
Cycling teams based in Germany
Defunct sports teams in Germany
Cycling teams established in 2003
Cycling teams disestablished in 2015
2003 establishments in the United States
2015 disestablishments in the United States